Tinne Kruse (born 19 November 1986) is a Danish female badminton player.

Achievements

European Junior Championships
Girls' Doubles

BWF International Challenge/Series
Women's Doubles

 BWF International Challenge tournament
 BWF International Series tournament
 BWF Future Series tournament

References

External links
 

1986 births
Living people
Danish female badminton players
21st-century Danish women